Peter Nelson (born 5 October 1992) from Dungannon is a  rugby union player. He formerly played at the position of fullback for Ulster.

Nelson is a versatile back who can play at out-half, full-back, centre or wing.

Club career
Nelson made his debut for Ulster against Leinster in December 2011. He scored his first try for Ulster against Benetton Treviso in November 2012.

In May 2019, it was announced that Nelson would be leaving Ulster after eight seasons.

In 2020, Nelson agreed a deal with Seattle Seawolves to play in Major League Rugby, however that move was abandoned due to the coronavirus pandemic.

International career

Ireland
Nelson has represented Ireland at both under-18 and under-20 level.

Canada
In June 2019, Nelson was selected by Canada for the Pacific Nations Cup. He is eligible for Canada through his Vancouver-born grandmother. He made his Canada debut in the tournament against the USA Eagles. 

He was named in the Canada squad for the 2019 World Cup and made his tournament debut against Italy on 26 September.

References

External links
 Peter Nelson - Canada ESPN Scrum
 Player profile - Peter Nelson Rugby World Cup

1992 births
Living people
Ulster Rugby players
Rugby union fullbacks
Dungannon RFC players
Irish rugby union players
Canada international rugby union players